Surf (known as Sunil in the Netherlands) is a British brand of laundry detergent manufactured and marketed around the world by Unilever, except in the United States, Canada and Puerto Rico, where it has been owned by Sun Products (now Henkel Corporation) since 2008.

The brand was introduced in 1952 by Crosfields of Warrington, a subsidiary company of Lever Brothers in the United Kingdom.  Surf was introduced in the United States in 1959 after Rinso, which had been Lever Brothers Company's lead laundry brand, had declined in sales and market share.

In 1998, January Isaac who played Lumen in Commercial while Lola Obang (Nina Medina) and her Son Lando (Nap Miranda) and their twins Ana and Maria (Charice and Charlotte Hermoso) in Philippines.

Present in the Brazilian market since 2003, soap powder is currently sold in the following fragrances: Rosas and Flor de Lis; Hydrangeas and White Flowers; Passion Flower and Daisy; and Cherry Blossom and Lavender. It is also available in the form of liquid soap, in the version Jasmine do Oriente and Flor de Lotus. The Tablet version (Bar) was no longer manufactured in July/2010.

References

External links
 Surf - Unilever UK & Ireland
 Surf - Henkel USA

Products introduced in 1959
Laundry detergents
Cleaning products
Cleaning product brands
Unilever brands
Henkel brands
British brands